Tennessee increased its apportionment from 1 seat to 3 seats after the 1800 census.

See also 
 United States House of Representatives elections, 1802 and 1803
 List of United States representatives from Tennessee

1802
Tennessee
United States House of Representatives
Tennessee
United States House of Representatives